Eriogonum brachypodum is a species of wild buckwheat known by the common name Parry's buckwheat. This annual herb is native to the southwestern United States from California to Utah and especially the Mojave Desert. It grows in sandy and gravelly substrates. It has a skeletonlike spindly stem which branches many times. It can grow 5 to 50 centimeters in height and up to a meter in width. There is an array of rounded, dark-colored leaves around the base. Leaves are a few centimeters long and fuzzy on the undersides. Most of the plant is actually the spreading inflorescence. At intervals on the otherwise naked branches hang tiny clusters of glandular flowers a few millimeters wide in involucres of bell-shaped bracts. Each flower is less than three millimeters wide.

References

External links
Jepson Manual Treatment
Photo gallery

North American desert flora
brachypodum